Marissa Veronica Young (born August 30, 1981) is an American softball coach who is the current head softball coach at Duke University, a post she has held since 2016.

Playing career
Young played her college softball as a pitcher for Michigan, and was named Big Ten Pitcher of the Year in 2002 and Big Ten Player of the Year in 2003.

Coaching career
Prior to joining Duke, Young was an assistant coach at North Carolina from 2014 to 2015.

In July 2015, Young became the inaugural head coach at Duke, whose softball program began play during the 2016 season.

Head coaching record

References

1981 births
Living people
Michigan Wolverines softball players
Duke Blue Devils softball coaches
Eastern Michigan Eagles softball coaches
North Carolina Tar Heels softball coaches
Female sports coaches
American softball coaches
Sportspeople from Santa Ana, California
Softball players from California
Softball coaches from California